Craig Owens is an American musician.

Craig Owens may also refer to:

Craig Owens (critic), American gay activist, post-modernist art critic and feminist
Craig Owens, a character in the science fiction TV show Doctor Who episodes "The Lodger" and "Closing Time"